Thaavalam is a 1983 Indian Malayalam film, directed by Thampi Kannanthanam and produced by Koshi Ninan and Philip Maryvilla. The film stars M. G. Soman, Mohanlal, Jayabharathi, Shubha and Menaka in the lead roles. The film has musical score by Johnson.

Cast

Jayabharathi
Mohanlal
Shubha
Menaka
Balan K. Nair
C. I. Paul
Kuthiravattam Pappu
M. G. Soman
Mala Aravindan
Ravikumar
Uma Bharani
Raveendran

Soundtrack
The music was composed by Johnson and the lyrics were written by Poovachal Khader.

References

External links
 

1983 films
1980s Malayalam-language films